Las Brujas De South Beach (The Witches of South Beach) is a Spanish-language telenovela produced by the United States-based television network Telemundo.  It stars Natalia Streignard, Ana Lucía Domínguez, Jullye Giliberti and Catherine Siachoque as four alluring women who were sisters in a past life. This fantasy melodrama was expected to debut in 2009, but the project was cancelled.

Cast
 Natalia Streignard - Lola
 Jullye Giliberti - Catalina
 Ana Lucía Domínguez - Eva
 Catherine Siachoque - Damaris
 José Ángel Llamas -

References

External links
 Telemundo teaser trailer (Spanish with English subtitles)
 Preview Clips from pilot. (Telemundo)

Unaired television pilots
Telemundo telenovelas
Television series by Universal Television